Fala is a compilation album, published by Poland's record label Polton in 1985. Fala is regarded as the first official presentation of Polish punk rock, new wave music as well as reggae, and most of the songs in the album were recorded at the 1984 Jarocin Festival. The album was the idea of Sławomir Gołaszewski, who asked Robert Brylewski for help with the selection of songs.

The album was produced by Dr Avane, together with Włodzimierz Kowalczyk and Tadeusz Czehak. Mix, overdub – Ekipa Dub Regulator, Shpenyagah, Max Hebel, Dr Avane. Graphic design – Alek Januszewski. Photos – Robert Sobociński, Antoni Zdebiak, Prowokacja.

Track listing 
 Side 1
 12 RA 3L – "Intro" – 0:45
 Bakshish – "Czarna droga" (J. Kowalczyk, J. Kowalczyk) – 3:50
 Prowokacja – "Prawo do życia, czyli kochanej mamusi" (Prowokacja, Prowokacja) – 2:55
 Siekiera – "Fala" (T. Adamski, T. Adamski) – 1:25
 Siekiera – "Idzie wojna" (T. Adamski, T. Adamski) – 3:35
 Abaddon – "Kto" (Abaddon, Abaddon) – 2:00
 Tilt – "Za zamkniętymi drzwiami (Widziałem cię)" (T. Lipiński, T. Lipiński) – 3:25

 Side 2
 Dezerter – "Nie ma zagrożenia" (Dezerter, Dezerter) – 2:30
 Kryzys – "Mam dość" (R. Brylewski, M. Góralski) – 2:50
 Kultura – "Lew Ja i Ja Dub" (Kultura, Kultura) – 2:30
 Rio Ras – "City Huk" (Rio Ras, Rio Ras) – 3:30
 Dezerter – "Plakat" (Dezerter, Dezerter) – 3:10
 Izrael – "Wolność" (R. Brylewski, R. Brylewski) – 8:10
 Józef Broda – "Swoboda" (J. Broda, J. Broda) – 0:55

Notes

External links 
 Cover of the album
 Bakshish's Czarna droga at youtube

Punk rock albums by Polish artists
New wave albums by Polish artists
Reggae albums by Polish artists
1985 compilation albums
Compilation albums by Polish artists